John Boyd Wilson ( 6 October 1928 - 29 August 2003) was a British philosopher of education and a pioneer of modern moral education in western Europe.

Books
 Logic and Sexual Morality (Penguin, 1965)
 Equality (Hutchinson, 1966) 
 Education in Religion and the Emotions (Heinemann, 1971)
 Introduction to Moral Education 
 Moral Thinking
 Practical Methods of Moral Education
 Values and Moral Development in Higher Education (Croom Helm, 1974)

References

Philosophers of education
1928 births
2003 deaths
20th-century British philosophers